
This list includes fictional representations of real (named) composers and musicians, and of fictional characters under other names that are generally agreed to be based on a specific composer, or sometimes a composite of several.

Johann Sebastian Bach
 Esther Meynell: The Little Chronicle of Magdalena Bach (1925)

Arnold Bax
 Rebecca West: Harriet Hume (1929)  (The title character based on Harriet Cohen)

Ludwig van Beethoven
 Jessica Duchan: Immortal (2020)
 Sanford Friedman: Conversations with Beethoven (1980s, published in 2014)
 Paul Griffiths: Mr Beethoven (2020)
 Esther Meynell: Grave Fairytale (1931) (as Melchior)
 Elizabeth Sara Sheppard: Rumour: A Novel (1858) (as Rodomant)
 John Suchet: The Last Master (1997–99) (fictional biography in three volumes)

William Sterndale Bennett
 Elizabeth Sara Sheppard: Charles Auchester (1853) (as Starwood Burney)

Hector Berlioz
 Anthony Burgess: Mozart & the Wolf Gang (1991)
 Jude Morgan: Symphony (2006)
 Elizabeth Sara Sheppard: Charles Auchester (1853) (as Florimond Anastasa)

Lord Berners
 Nancy Mitford: The Pursuit of Love (1945) (as Lord Merlin)
 Osbert Sitwell: 'The Love Bird' from Dumb Animal and Other Stories (1930) (as Sir Robert Mainwroth)

Hildegard of Bingen
 Mary Sharratt: Illuminations (2012)

Mario Braggiotti
 F. Scott Fitzgerald: Tender is The Night (1934) (as Tommy Barban)

Benjamin Britten
 Ian McEwan: Amsterdam (1998) (Clive Linley, correspondencies with Britten)

Thomas Busby
 George Borrow: Lavengro (1851) (as editor of the "Universal Review")

Frédéric Chopin
 George Sand: Lucrezia Floriani (1846)
 Nell Stevens: Briefly, a Delicious Life (2022)

Harriet Cohen
 William Gerhardie: Pending Heaven (1930) (as Helen Sapphire)
 D H Lawrence: Kangeroo (1923) (as Harriet)
 Rebecca West: Harriet Hume (1929)

Michael Costa
 Elizabeth Sara Sheppard: Charles Auchester (1853) (as St Michel)

Noël Coward
 Charles Brackett: Entirely Surrounded (1934) (as Nick Farraday)
 Beverley Nichols: Death to Slow Music (as Nigel Fleet)
 David Pownall: Facade (radio play, 2002)

Christian Darnton
 Nigel Balchin: Darkness Falls From the Air (1942) (as the poet Stephen Ryle)

Claude Debussy
 Pierre La Mure: Clair de lune (1962)
 Marcel Proust: À la recherche du temps perdu (1913-27) (aspects of Vinteuil, see also Franck and Saint-Saëns)

Frederick Delius
 C F Keary: The Journalist (1898) (as Sophus Jonsen)

Edward J Dent
 E. M. Forster: Where Angels Fear to Tread (1905) (as Philip Herriton)

Delia Derbyshire
 Rosemary Tonks: The Bloater (1968) (as Jenny)

Arnold Dolmetsch
 George Moore: Evelyn Innes (1898) (as the father of Evelyn)

Edward Elgar
 Keith Alldritt: Elgar on the Journey to Hanley: A Novel (1979)
 Anthony Burgess: Mozart & the Wolf Gang (1991)
 James Hamilton-Paterson: Gerontius (1989)
 David Pownall: Elgar’s Rondo (1993)
 David Pownall: Elgar’s Third (1994)

César Franck
 Marcel Proust: À la recherche du temps perdu (1913-27) (aspects of Vinteuil, see also Debussy and Saint-Saëns)

George Gershwin
 Anthony Burgess: Mozart & the Wolf Gang (1991)
 Mitchell James Kaplan. Rhapsody (2021)
 George Kaufman and Moss Hart: Merrily We Roll Along (1934) (as Sam Frankl)

Carlo Gesualdo
 David Pownall: Music to Murder By (1976)

Jimmy Glover
 George Moore: A Mummer's Wife (1885) (as Montgomery)

Glenn Gould
 Christopher Miller: Sudden Noises from Inanimate Objects: A Novel in Liner Notes (2004)

Cecil Gray
 H.D.: Bid Me to Live (1960) (as Vane)
 Aldous Huxley: Antic Hay (1923) (as the critic Mercaptan)
 D.H.Lawrence: Aaron's Rod (1922) (as Cyril Scott) 
 D.H.Lawrence: Kangaroo (1923) (as James Sharpe)
 Anthony Powell: Casanova's Chinese Restaurant (Maclintick and Gossege as a composite)

George Frideric Handel
 Nick Drake: All the Angels: Handel and the First Messiah (2015)

Josef Matthias Hauer
 Hermann Hesse: The Glass Bead Game (1943) (as model for Joculator Basiliensis ("the player from Basel").
 ': Sonnenmelodie (1923)
 Franz Werfel:  (1924) (as Matthias Fischboeck)

Charles Edward Horsley
 Elizabeth Sara Sheppard: Charles Auchester (1853) (as Charles Auchester)

John Pyke Hullah
 Elizabeth Sara Sheppard: Charles Auchester (1853) (as Lenhart Davy)

Halfdan Jebe
 C F Keary: The Journalist (1898) (as Hauch)

Maurice Jacobson
 Stevie Smith: Novel on Yellow Paper (1936) (as Herman)

Joseph Joachim
 Elizabeth Sara Sheppard: Charles Auchester (1853) (as Charles Auchester)

Aram Khachaturian
 David Pownall: Master Class (1982)

Constant Lambert
 Anthony Powell: Casanova's Chinese Restaurant (as Moreland)
 David Pownall: Facade (radio play, 2002)

Henry Lawes
 Robert Graves: Wife to Mr Milton (1942)

Franz Liszt
 Daniel Stern: Nélida (1846)
 Susanne Dunlap: Liszt's Kiss (2007)
 George Eliot: Daniel Deronda (1876) (aspects of Julius Klesmer, see also Rubenstein)

Elisabeth Lutyens
 Henry Reed: The Private Life of Hilda Tablet (1954) (as Tablet)

Alma Mahler
 Max Phillips: The Artist’s Wife (2001)
 Mary Sharratt: Ecstasy (2018)

Gustav Mahler
 Ronald Harwood: Mahler’s Conversion (2001)
 Thomas Mann: Death in Venice (aspects of the author Aschenbach)
 Stefan Zweig: The Return of Gustav Mahler (1915), semi-fictional essay

Fanny Mendelssohn
 Peter Härtling: Liebste Fenchel (2011)
 Elizabeth Sara Sheppard: Charles Auchester (1853) (as Maria Cerinthea)

Felix Mendelssohn
 Anthony Burgess: Mozart & the Wolf Gang (1991)
 Pierre La Mure: Beyond Desire (1955)
 Elizabeth Sara Sheppard: Charles Auchester (1853) (as Seraphael)

Noel Mewton-Wood
 Sonia Orchard: The Virtuosso (2009)

Wolfgang Amadeus Mozart
 Anthony Burgess: Mozart & the Wolf Gang (1991)
 Stephanie Cowell: Marrying Mozart (2004)
 Alexander Pushkin: Mozart and Salieri (1830)
 Peter Shaffer: Amadeus (1979)

Hubert Parry
 George Bernard Shaw: Love Among the Artists (1881) (as Owen Jack)

Helen Perkin
 Carl Ginsburg: Medicine Journeys: Ten Stories (Center Press, 1983) (as Mrs Todd Ashby)

Sergei Prokofiev
 Anthony Burgess: Mozart & the Wolf Gang (1991)
 David Pownall: Master Class (1982)

Maurice Ravel
 Arnold Bennett: The Lion's Share (1916) {as Roussel)

Gioachino Rossini
 Anthony Burgess: Mozart & the Wolf Gang (1991)

Anton Rubinstein
 George Eliot: Daniel Deronda (1876) (aspects of Julius Klesmer, see also Liszt)

Camille Saint-Saëns
 Marcel Proust: À la recherche du temps perdu (1913-27) (aspects of Vinteuil, see also Debussy and Franck)

Antonio Salieri
 Alexander Pushkin: Mozart and Salieri (1830)
 Peter Shaffer: Amadeus (1979)

Godfrey Sampson
 Edmund Crispen: Holy Disorders (1945) (as Geoffrey Vintner)

Erik Satie
 Caitlin Horrocks: Vexations (2019)

Arnold Schoenberg
 Thomas Mann: Doctor Faustus (1947) (aspects of Adrian Leverkühn, see also Wolf)

Franz Schubert
 Peter Härtling: Schubert: A Novel (1995)
 Gaëlle Josse: Un été à quatre mains

Clara Schumann
 Janice Galloway: Clara (2004)
 Elisabeth Kyle: Duet: The Story of Robert and Clara Schumann (1968)
 J. D. Landis: Longing (2000)

Robert Schumann
 Jessica Duchen: Ghost Variations (2016)
 Elisabeth Kyle: Duet: The Story of Robert and Clara Schumann (1968)
 Peter Härtling: Schumanns Schatten (1996)

Dmitri Shostakovich
 Julian Barnes: The Noise of Time (2016)
 David Pownall: Master Class (1982)
 Sarah Quigley: The Conductor (2012)
 William T. Vollmann: Europe Central (2005)

Jean Sibelius
 Simon Boswell: The Seven Symphonies: A Finnish Murder Mystery (2005)
 Caroline J Sinclair: My Music, My Drinking & Me (2015) (fictionalised memoir)

Ethel Smyth
 E. F. Benson: Dodo (1893) (as Edith Stains)

Kaikhosru Sorabji
 Christopher Miller: Sudden Noises from Inanimate Objects: A Novel in Liner Notes (2004)

Barbara Strozzi
 Russell Hoban. My Tango with Barbara Strozzi (2007) ((as modern day Bertha Strunk)

Kay Swift
 Mitchell James Kaplan. Rhapsody (2021)

Antonio Vivaldi
 Barbara Quick: Vivaldi's Virgins (2007)

William Walton
 Lord Berners: Count Omega (1941) (as Emmanuel Smith)
 David Pownall: Facade (radio play, 2002)

Richard Wagner
 Anthony Burgess: Mozart & the Wolf Gang (1991)

Peter Warlock
 Frank Baker: The Birds (1936) (as Paul Weaver)
 Ralph Bates: Dead End of the Sky (1937) (as Robert Durand)
 Robertson Davies: A Mixture of Frailties (1958) (as Giles Revelstoke)
 Aldous Huxley: Antic Hay (1923) (as Coleman)
 D. H. Lawrence: Women in Love (1921) (as Julius Halliday)
 Anthony Powell: Casanova's Chinese Restaurant (1960) (aspects of Maclintick)
 David Pownall: Music to Murder By (1976)
 Jean Rhys: Till September Petronella (short story, 1930s) (as Julian Oakes)
 Osbert Sitwell: Those Were the Days (1938) (as Roy Hartle)

Hugo Wolf
 Thomas Mann: Doctor Faustus (1947) (aspects of Adrian Leverkühn, see also Schoenberg)

Carl Friedrich Zelter
 Elizabeth Sara Sheppard: Charles Auchester (1853) (as Aronach)

Further reading
Amos, William: The Originals: Who's Really Who in Fiction? (1985)
 Rintoul, M.C. Dictionary of Real People and Places in Fiction (2014)
 Weliver, Phyllis. The Musical Crowd in English Fiction (2006)
 Weliver, Phyllis. Women Musicians in Victorian Fiction, 1860-1900 (2000)
 Art in Fiction website
 List of composers depicted on film

References 

 
 
Wolfgang Amadeus Mozart in fiction
 
George Frideric Handel in fiction